Juan Durán de Miranda was a soldier who served as governor of New Mexico in the 1600s. He occupied the charge of governor of New Mexico twice (1664-1665 and 1671-1675). The existing information on him is scarce.

Career 
Durán de Miranda was appointed governor of New Mexico for in 1664. He was expelled and arrested in 1665. Despite this, he was appointed for a second term in New Mexico in 1671.

However, one year later, in 1665 a faction led by Tomé Domínguez de Mendoza accused (and filed charges against) Durán de Miranda, which caused Miranda to be imprisoned in a brief time period
 in the Casa de Cabildo (Council jail) in Santa Fe. In addition, all his goods were seized. However, he was released when he presented arguments against the charges for which he is charged in Mexico City, recovering his property and position. 

Again in the New Mexico government, church and state clashed, which weakened the colonial administration. This caused Native American people to increasingly reject the Spanish Empire. In addition, the Mission Supply Service, founded by the Mansso administration, reduced the food and other products that distributed among the indigenous population, causing them to rebel against the Miranda government.

In July 1671, Durán de Miranda elevated Juan Dominguez de Mendoza to Field marshal rank and led a military campaign against the Gila Apache and the "Siete Ríos Apaches", in the South of New Mexico.

In 1675, Durán de Miranda was replaced by Juan Francisco Treviño and he emigrated to Mexico City.

References 

Colonial governors of Santa Fe de Nuevo México